Kirsten Menger-Anderson (born December 6, 1969 in Santa Cruz, California) is an American fiction writer. Her first book, a collection of linked short stories titled Doctor Olaf van Schuler's Brain, was published by Algonquin Books in 2008. A number of the collected stories have also appeared in literary journals, such as Ploughshares and the Southwest Review. Menger-Anderson has a degree in Economics from Haverford College and an MA in English and creative writing from San Francisco State University. She previously held positions at Salon.com and Wired.com. Menger-Anderson currently lives in an old Victorian house in San Francisco with her husband and children. Her grandfather is the mathematician Karl Menger.

Publications 

 Doctor Olaf van Schuler’s Brain, a collection of linked short stories, Algonquin, September, 2008 
 Salk and Sabin, a short story, Ploughshares, Issue #106 Vol. 34/2&3 Fall 2008
 The Doctors, a short story, Post Road, Issue 16 Fall/Winter 2008 
 The Baquet, a short story, Southwest Review, Volume 89, Number 2 & 3, 2004
 Reading Grandpa’s Head, a short story, Maryland Review, Volume 1 Fall 2004
 The Story of Her Breasts, a short story, Plaztik Press, 2004
 Kathleen, a short story, Pindeldyboz, 2003
 Blue Glow, a short story, Lynx Eye, Volume X Number 4 Fall 2003
 Gretle, a short story, Wascana Review, Volume 36, Number 2 Fall, 2001

Critical acclaim 

Doctor Olaf van Schuler's Brain was a finalist for the Northern California Book Award. It was selected as one of 2008’s best books by the Sun Sentinel Books editor, Chauncey Mabe and was included in Chicago Time Out’s “Top 10 for 2008” as well as SEED Magazine’s top picks for 2008. Several of her short stories have been short-listed for awards, including the Richard Yates Award, the Glimmer Train Short Story Award for New Writers, the Iowa Review Story Contest, and the Andre Dubus Award.

References

External links 
 Author's website
 Author's brain blog
 Podcast of author from “Writers on Writing”
 Podcast of author from Rick Kleffel’s “Bookotron” radio show: Part One; Part Two

Reviews of Doctor Olaf van Schuler’s Brain 
 “Mental Health, With Strings Attached,” a review by Carolyn See for the Washington Post
 “Odd, intriguing stories of quacks and cures,” a review by Eric Grunwald for the Boston Globe
 “Annals of Malpractice,” a review by Francesca Mari for the New York Times
 “Gadzooks! The human brain!” a review by Jack Booch for the Vancouver Voice
 “Hysteria, insanity--it's all in the family,” a review by Vanessa Hua for the San Francisco Chronicle
 “Book Review: Doctor Olaf van Schuler's Brain,” a review by Robert Duffer for Chicago Time Out

1969 births
Living people
21st-century American novelists
American women novelists
American women short story writers
Writers from Santa Cruz, California
Haverford College alumni
San Francisco State University alumni
21st-century American women writers
21st-century American short story writers